Journey to the West: Legends of the Monkey King is a 1998 animated series produced by China Central Television and the CINAR Corporation. It is based on the 16th-century novel Journey to the West. There are 26 episodes (52 segments) in total, with a duration of about 22 minutes each (11 minutes per segment), along with a 75-minute prequel television film.

The English-language version of the show was produced by Cinar (now DHX Media, previously Cookie Jar Group). It first aired on Teletoon in Canada in 2000, and was later aired on the Cookie Jar Toons block on This TV in the United States from 2009 to 2010. In Indonesia, it was broadcast by Indosiar in 1999 to 2000 every Monday morning.

The production began in 1992. It has been regarded as a classic of Chinese animation.

Summary 
Sun Wukong, who was born from a magic stone, has been imprisoned underneath a mountain for five centuries for his mischief in the heavens. One day, the Guanyin told Monkey that the Monk Tang Sanzang will set him free and Monkey will join him on a pilgrimage from China to India. The next day, Tripitaka came and set Monkey free, and the two started their Journey to the West. Along the way, they meet two new friends, Zhu Bajie and the Hermit Sha Wujing, who join them on the journey; together, they face many dangers and evil creatures and sorcerers and learn to get along.

Cast 

Additional voices (Mandarin): Hai Fan, Di Feifei, Luo Gangsheng, Diang Jianhua, Liu Qin, Bai Tao, Wang Xiaobing, Sun Yufeng, Jiang Yuling

Episodes

Note: In the Original 1998 Chinese edition of the series, there are instead 52 episodes, with the prequels making up episodes 1-7

Movie
A separate 75-minute television film under the same title serves as a prequel to the series.

References

2000 Chinese television series debuts
2000s Canadian animated television series
2000 Canadian television series debuts
2000 Canadian television series endings
Canadian children's animated action television series
Canadian children's animated adventure television series
Canadian children's animated fantasy television series
Chinese children's animated action television series
Chinese children's animated adventure television series
Chinese children's animated fantasy television series
China Central Television original programming
Television series by Cookie Jar Entertainment
Television shows based on Journey to the West
Teletoon original programming